Allan Alexander Maconochie of Meadowbank and Garvock FRSE (1806–1885) was a Scottish advocate and amateur botanist. He was Professor of Civil Law at Glasgow University. In legal documents he is referred to as A. A. Maconochie.

Life
He was born in 1806 the eldest son of Alexander Maconochie, Lord Meadowbank and Anne Blair (daughter of the law lord Robert Blair, Lord Avontoun).
He qualified as an advocate in 1829.

In 1840 he was elected a Fellow of the Royal Society of Edinburgh his proposer being Thomas Charles Hope.
From 1843 to 1855 he was Professor of Civil Law at Glasgow University In 1855 he received an honorary doctorate (LLD) from Glasgow University.

In later life he adopted the name Maconochie-Welwood.

He died on 29 May 1885.

Family
He married twice: in 1836 to Ellen Wiggin and secondly in 1859 to Lady Margaret Penny (a widow).

References

1806 births
1885 deaths
Academics of the University of Glasgow
Fellows of the Royal Society of Edinburgh
Scottish lawyers
Scottish botanists